The 2002 Major League Baseball All-Star Game was the 73rd playing of the midsummer classic between the all-stars of the American League (AL) and National League (NL), the two leagues that make up Major League Baseball. The game was held on July 9, 2002 at Miller Park, now named American Family Field, in Milwaukee, Wisconsin, the home of the Milwaukee Brewers of the NL. The game controversially ended with a 7–7 tie due to both teams running out of available pitchers. Beginning the next year, home field advantage in the World Series would be awarded to the winning league to prevent ties (this rule would stay until 2017).

No player was awarded the Most Valuable Player (MVP) Award due to the game ending in a tie. The roster selection for the 2002 game marked the inaugural All-Star Final Vote competition (then known as "The All-Star 30th Man" competition). Johnny Damon and Andruw Jones represented the American and National Leagues as a result of this contest.

Rosters
Players in italics have since been inducted into the National Baseball Hall of Fame.

Final roster spot

American League

National League

Notes
 Player declined or was unable to play.
 Player replaced vacant spot on roster.
 Player was voted onto roster through the All-Star Final Vote.

Starting lineups

Game

Umpires

Game summary

National League starting pitcher Curt Schilling was sharp early on, striking out three through two innings pitched. In the bottom of the first, Barry Bonds hit a deep fly ball off AL starter Derek Lowe, which looked to be deep enough to be a home run. Instead, center fielder Torii Hunter reached over the wall and caught Bonds' drive, denying the NL an early lead. Bonds playfully picked up Hunter as the NL took the field the next inning.

The NL would get on the board in the bottom of the second, when a Mike Piazza groundout scored Vladimir Guerrero from third. They'd score three more runs the next inning, when Todd Helton singled home Jimmy Rollins. Barry Bonds would get revenge for having his first-inning home run taken away by belting a two-run shot to give the NL a 4–0 lead. The AL would finally score in the fourth, on the strength of a Manny Ramírez RBI single.

The AL would cut the NL lead in half in the fifth, when Alfonso Soriano hit a homer off Éric Gagné to cut the lead to 4–2. The NL got a run back with Damian Miller's RBI double to put the NL up 5–2. The AL put together a big inning in the seventh to take the lead. An RBI groundout from Garret Anderson, an RBI single from Tony Batista, and a two-run double from Paul Konerko scored four runs for the AL, giving them a 6–5 lead after their half of the seventh.

The NL regained the lead in the bottom of the seventh, on a two-run single from Lance Berkman, which scored Mike Lowell and Damian Miller. The AL quickly tied the game back up in the eighth with Omar Vizquel's RBI triple. Neither team scored in the ninth, and the game went into extra innings. Vicente Padilla and Freddy García each pitched scoreless tenth innings, keeping the game tied.

A serious problem arose at this point, as Padilla and Garcia were the last available pitchers on each team. After a scoreless top of the 11th inning, AL and NL managers Joe Torre and Bob Brenly met by the first base dugout with Commissioner Bud Selig to discuss the situation.

It was controversially ruled that if the NL did not score in the bottom of the 11th, the game would be declared a tie. After the decision was announced over the stadium's public address system, fans loudly booed and jeered, with beer bottles being thrown onto the field, and chants of "Let them play!", "Refund!", "Bud must go!" and "Ripoff!" were heard. Garcia retired the side in the 11th, and the game ended in a 7–7 tie, to further booing and bottle throwing. No MVP award was given.

Home Run Derby
The Home Run Derby took place on July 8 with eight players, four from each league, competing to try to hit as many home runs as possible.

Giambi defeated Konerko in a blast off, similar to penalty shots

Notes
Before the game, Red Sox All-Stars Nomar Garciaparra, Johnny Damon and Ugueth Urbina unveiled a No. 9 (in honor of Ted Williams, who died a few days earlier) painted into the grass in left field—the position the "Splendid Splinter" patrolled in 19 All-Star Games while playing for Boston.  It was also the introduction of the uniform change for the Red Sox, adding a black "9" and black armband on the right sleeve of the jersey, for the remainder of the 2002 season.
Davey Lopes was not selected as an NL coach, due to him being fired by the Brewers in mid April.
In the bottom of the first inning, Torii Hunter made a leaping catch of what would have been a home run by Barry Bonds. Initially lauded as a great play, the catch took on extra significance when the game ended in a tie and the play was voted the play of the year on MLB.com.  Bonds hit one out later in the game to make sure that Torii couldn't rob him again.
In Bernie's Dugout above left field, mascots from multiple MLB teams joined Bernie and pushed each other down the slide every time a home run was made.
When Freddy García batted in the 11th inning, he wore a Chicago White Sox helmet; coincidentally, he was traded to the White Sox two years later.
With the American League having five shortstops and one second baseman, Omar Vizquel came off the bench to play second base.
After the first out was recorded in the bottom of the 11th, public address announcer Robb Edwards announced the decision that if the National League did not score, the game would end in a tie. They did not, and it did. When the game was called, the fans started the Bad News Bears chant of "Let them Play!, Let them Play!" to no avail.
Joe Buck and Tim McCarver stated that if the American League had won, Paul Konerko would have been named MVP, and if the National League had won, Damian Miller would have been named MVP.
Throughout the game, both managers wore microphones to converse with Buck, McCarver, and each other.

References
General

Specific

External links
All-Star Game Home Page
Home Run Derby
Boxscore and Game Recap
Sport Illustrated Recap
ESPN.com Recap

Major League Baseball All-Star Game
Major League Baseball All-Star Game
Baseball competitions in Milwaukee
Major League Baseball controversies
Major League Baseball All Star Game
2000s in Milwaukee
July 2002 sports events in the United States